David Ignatius Finnegan (January 28, 1941 – October 12, 2015) was an American attorney, talk show host, and politician. He was a partner at Finnegan, Underwood, Ryan & Tierney.

Political career
Finnegan was a member of the Boston School Committee from 1975 to 1979 and served as its president from 1978 to 1979. He was a candidate for Mayor of Boston in 1979, finishing fourth out of six candidates with 14.59% of the vote. He ran again in 1983, finishing in third place with 24.99%.

Talk show host
Finnegan began his media career in 1979 as host of The Dave Finnegan Show on WBZ Radio. He subsequently hosted Weekend with Dave Finnegan on WNAC-TV. He gave up both of his shows to run for Mayor in 1983.

Personal life
Finnegan was born on January 28, 1941. He was the brother-in-law of astronaut Michael Collins and the uncle of actress Kate Collins.

He was a graduate of Stonehill College (B.A.), Boston University School of Law (J.D.), and Harvard University (A.L.M.). Finnegan died on October 12, 2015 from lung cancer.

References

Lawyers from Boston
Stonehill College alumni
Boston University School of Law alumni
Harvard Extension School alumni
Boston School Committee members
2015 deaths
1941 births
20th-century American lawyers